Andrejs Kovaļovs (born 23 March 1989 in Daugavpils) is a Latvian footballer who most recently played for BFC Daugavpils and also represents the Latvia national football team.

Club career 
Kovaļovs started playing football in 1997, at the age of 7. He was a member of the Daugava Daugavpils youth team and played under his first managers Aleksandrs Kohans and Ēvalds Stankevičs. Developing through the youth system Kovaļovs reached the first team of Daugava Daugavpils in 2007, when he was included in the squad entry for the following season. Being just 18 years of age Kovaļovs struggled with limited playing time, appearing in just three games over the first two seasons with the club. Nonetheless, in 2008 he helped the club win the Latvian Football Cup for the first time in its history.

In 2009 his playing time grew to 9 appearances and Kovaļovs managed to score his first two goals in the Latvian Higher League. In 2010 Kovaļovs became a vital player in the team's first eleven and since then till 2013 participated in 106 league matches and scored 25 goals. In 2011, he made his debut in the UEFA Europa League playing against the Norwegian club Tromsø IL. In 2012 Kovaļovs became the champion of Latvia, with Daugava winning its first ever title of the Latvian Higher League.

In 2013 they won the Latvian Supercup and became the first ever club to win it as the tournament was initially introduced that year. The 2013 season individually proved to be Kovaļovs' most successful one with the club. Scoring 16 goals in 27 matches he became the top scorer of the league and led Daugava to bronze medals in the Latvian championship. Kovaļovs was named Player of the Month in June 2013 and after the season was included in the Sporta Avīze and Sportacentrs.com teams of the season. In the nomination for the best midfielder's award he lost to Jurijs Žigajevs, but was still presented as the top scorer at the Latvian Football Federation Awards Ceremony in December 2013.

In March 2013 Kovaļovs went on trial with the Spanish La Liga club Levante UD, but did not stay with the club despite scoring twice in a friendly match. In December 2013 he was linked with a move to the Polish Ekstraklasa side Jagiellonia Białystok, but with the club's long-term hesitation to offer a contract after a successful trial period Kovaļovs voluntarily broke off the transfer talks. In February 2014 he joined the Moldovan National Division club Dacia Chişinău, signing a contract till 30 June 2016.

International career 
Kovaļovs made his Latvia national football team debut on 17 November 2010, coming on as a substitute for Aleksandrs Fertovs in the 82nd minute in a friendly match against China. As of November 2014 he has played 10 international matches with his first goal yet to come.

Honours 
 Latvian Higher League champion: 2012
 Latvian Cup winner: 2008, 2015–16
 Latvian Super Cup winner: 2013
 Virslīga's Winter Cup winner: 2013
 Baltic Cup winner: 2014
 Latvian Higher League Top scorer: 2013

References

External links
 Profile at LFF.lv
 
 
 

1989 births
Living people
Latvian footballers
Latvia international footballers
Association football midfielders
FC Daugava players
FC Dacia Chișinău players
Skonto FC players
FK Jelgava players
Riga FC players
FK Spartaks Jūrmala players
FC Vereya players
BFC Daugavpils players
Latvian Higher League players
Moldovan Super Liga players
First Professional Football League (Bulgaria) players
Latvian expatriate footballers
Expatriate footballers in Moldova
Latvian expatriate sportspeople in Moldova
Expatriate footballers in Bulgaria
Latvian expatriate sportspeople in Bulgaria
Latvian people of Russian descent
Sportspeople from Daugavpils